Steven I. "Steve" Robman (born September 27, 1944) is an American television and theatre director/producer.

Biography
He graduated from Alexander Hamilton High School in Los Angeles, California (1962), University of California, Berkeley (1966), and the Yale School of Drama (1973).

He has been married to actress Kathy Baker since 2003. 

He was Artistic Director of the Phoenix Theatre in New York City from 1980 to 1982. He has also staged plays at the Manhattan Theatre Club, Playwrights Horizons, Long Wharf Theatre, the Guthrie Theater, Arena Stage, Actors Theatre of Louisville, Mark Taper Forum, Yale Repertory Theatre, and the Goodman Theatre. He has directed over 100 hours of television, including dramatic and comedy series as well as movies-of-the-week.

Television directing credits
 Ghost Whisperer
 Shark
 Pasadena
 Strong Medicine
 Relative Chaos
 Hello Sister, Goodbye Life
 Picking Up & Dropping Off
 Medium
 Windfall
 Love Rules
 I Do, They Don't
 The O.C.
 Gilmore Girls
 The Guardian
 Thieves
 Boston Public
 American Dreams
 The Audrey Hepburn Story (including Co-Executive Producer)
 Bull 
 Charles in Charge
 The Sons of Mistletoe
 Time of Your Life
 Dawson's Creek
 Blood on Her Hands
 L.A. Firefighters
 Moloney
 Party of Five
 Nowhere Man
 Murder One
 The Client
 Doogie Howser, M.D.
 Law & Order
 Diagnosis: Murder
 L.A. Law
 Melrose Place
 Brand New Life
 Baby Boom
 Northern Exposure
 Sisters
 thirtysomething
 Sweet Justice
 SeaQuest DSV
 Silver Spoons
 Family Ties
 The Facts of Life
 Theatre In America: Sea Marks
 Hull High
 Uncommon Women and Others (He has also directed the stage play that the movie was based on)

References 

 "Steven Robman." Contemporary Theatre, Film, and Television. Vol. 90. Gale, 2009.  Reproduced in Biography Resource Center. Farmington Hills, Michigan: Gale, 2009. Galegroup.com Fee, via Fairfax County Public Library.  Document Number: K1609025121.
  2.9

External links

 DGA Hosts Reception for TV Critics
 
 Long Wharf Theatre, 1976–1977 season
 TheFutonCritic
 Actor's Theatre
 TV.com
 Guthrie Theater
 
 Lortel
 Lifetime TV

American television directors
Living people
1944 births
Yale School of Drama alumni
University of California, Berkeley alumni
Place of birth missing (living people)
Film directors from Los Angeles
Alexander Hamilton High School (Los Angeles) alumni